The 2022 Critérium du Dauphiné was the 74th edition of the Critérium du Dauphiné, a road cycling stage race in the titular region of southeastern France. The race took place between 5 and 12 June 2022.

Teams 
All eighteen UCI WorldTeams and four UCI ProTeams make up the twenty-two teams that participate in the race.

UCI WorldTeams

 
 
 
 
 
 
 
 
 
 
 
 
 
 
 
 
 
 

UCI ProTeams

Route

Stages

Stage 1 
5 June 2022 — La Voulte-sur-Rhône to Beauchastel,

Stage 2 
6 June 2022 — Saint-Péray to Brives-Charensac,

Stage 3 
7 June 2022 — Saint-Paulien to Chastreix-Sancy,

Stage 4 
8 June 2022 — Montbrison to La Bâtie d'Urfé,  (ITT)

Stage 5 
9 June 2022 — Thizy-les-Bourgs to Chaintré,

Stage 6 
10 June 2022 — Rives to Gap,

Stage 7 
11 June 2022 — Saint-Chaffrey to Vaujany,

Stage 8 
12 June 2022 — Saint-Alban-Leysse to Plateau de Solaison,

Classification leadership table 

 On stage 2, Sean Quinn, who was third in the points classification, wore the green jersey, because first placed Wout van Aert wore the yellow jersey as the leader of the general classification and second placed Ethan Hayter wore the white jersey as the leader of the young rider classification. On stages 5, 6 and 7, Kevin Vermaerke, Hugo Page and Edvald Boasson Hagen respectively wore the green jersey for the same reason.
 On stage 4, Ethan Hayter, who was second in the points classification, wore the green jersey, because first placed Wout van Aert wore the yellow jersey as the leader of the general classification.

Final classification standings

General classification

Points classification

Mountains classification

Young rider classification

Team classification

Notes 

 As of 1 March 2022, the UCI announced that cyclists from Russia and Belarus would no longer compete under the name or flag of those respective countries due to the Russian invasion of Ukraine.

References

External links 
 

2022 UCI World Tour
2022 in French sport
2022
June 2022 sports events in France